Mahindra Lifespace Developers Ltd. is an Indian real estate and infrastructure development company headquartered in Mumbai, India. The company was founded in 1994 and is part of the Mahindra Group. The company is engaged in residential developments under the Mahindra Lifespaces and Happinest brands; and integrated cities and industrial clusters under the ‘Mahindra World City’ and ‘ORIGINS by Mahindra World City’ brands. The company has developed properties in Mumbai, Pune, Nagpur, Ahmedabad, Delhi NCR, Jaipur, Hyderabad, Chennai, and Bengaluru.

History 
GESCO Corporation Limited was incorporated as a Private Limited Company on 16 March 1999 which was converted to a Public Limited Company on 18 August 1999. GESCO was originally the real estate division of Great Eastern Shipping and was spun off into an independent company in April 1999. In 2001, GESCO Corporation and Mahindra Realty & Infrastructure Developers Ltd (MRIDL) demerged the realty and infrastructure divisions of MRIDL and merged it into GESCO. In 2007, the Company name was changed from Mahindra GESCO Developers Limited to Mahindra Lifespace Developers Ltd. (MLDL)

Mahindra World City, Chennai jointly developed by the Mahindra group and the Tamil Nadu Industrial Development Corporation, is corporate India's first operational private special economic zone (SEZ).

Board of directors 
The Board of Directors of the company is headed by Arun Nanda, chairman of Mahindra Lifespace Developers Ltd. and Mahindra Holidays & Resorts (I) Ltd. Other members of  the Board of Directors include Arvind Subramaniam, Anish Shah and Ameet Hariani, Bharat D. Shah and Amrita Verma Chowdhury hold the position of independent directors.

Projects (residential)

Current Projects
Mahindra Luminare is a Pre-certified IGBC platinum rated residential project launched by Mahindra Lifespaces Developers Ltd. in 2015. The project is located in Gurgaon, Sec. 59.
Mahindra Bloomdale is a residential project being developed over 25.25 acres of land in the MIHAN area of Nagpur and has been certified by the Indian Green Building Council.
Mahindra VICINO is a residential project located in Andheri East, Mumbai and has been certified by the Indian Green Building Council.
Mahindra Roots is located in the Kandivali East region in Mumbai and has been certified by the Indian Green Building Council.
Mahindra Happinest Kalyan is a project built under Pradhan Mantri Awas Yojana by Mahindra Lifespaces Developers Ltd. The project is spread over 9 acres.
Mahindra Happinest Palghar is a housing project built under a joint venture between Mahindra Lifespaces and HDFC Capital Advisors. The project is spread over an area of 8 acres off the Basawat Pada Road in Nandore.
 Mahindra Happinest Boisar is a housing project by Mahindra Lifespaces, located in the Boisar suburb of Mumbai. The project is spread over 14 acres of land.
 Mahindra Happinest Avadi is a full-fledged housing project launched by Mahindra Lifespaces in compliance with the Pradhan Mantri Awas Yojana. It is located in Chennai, and spreads over 13.22 acres of land.
 Mahindra Aqualily is a residential project situated inside Mahindra World City, a 1,500-acre township in Chennai. The residences have been planned across four phases.
Mahindra Lakewoods is a residential project situated inside Mahindra World City, a 1500-acre township in Chennai located at Chengalpet Taluk, Kancheepuram. The project is developed over 9.33 acres and has a Gold certification from the Indian Green Building Council (IGBC).
Mahindra Antheia is located in the Pimpri-Chinchwad region in Pune. It is a pre-certified IGBC gold rated project which is spread over 16.5 acres.
Mahindra Windchimes is a residential project located near the proposed IIM-Bengaluru and Hulimavu Metro Phase 2 station in Bengaluru. The project is built over an area of 5.85 acres and has a Platinum certification from the Indian Green Building Council (IGBC).

Integrated cities 

Developed in 2002, Mahindra World City is known as India's first integrated business city. It also happens to be the first IGBC Gold (Stage 1) certified Green Township in the country and corporate India's first operational SEZ. The Mahindra Group promotes it in partnership with Tamil Nadu Industrial Development Corporation (TIDCO). Spanning over 1,500 acres, MWC Chennai comprises multi-sector Special Economic Zones (SEZs), Domestic Tariff Area (DTA), Residential and Social Zones.
Mahindra World City, Jaipur (MWCJ) is a strategically located integrated business city spread across 3000 acres providing access to North and West markets. It is Asia's 1st and the world's largest project to reach Stage 2 of C40 Climate Initiative, a global benchmark for creating sustainable, carbon positive cities of the future. MWC Jaipur is a joint venture between Mahindra Lifespace Developers Ltd. and the Rajasthan State Industrial Development and Investment Corporation Ltd (RIICO). It consists of a Multi-Product Special Economic Zone (SEZ), a Domestic Tariff Area (DTA) and Social & Residential Infrastructure Zones.

Industrial cluster 

 ORIGINS by Mahindra World City is a planned industrial cluster that has been developed together by Mahindra World City, Chennai and the Sumitomo Corporation, Japan. The cluster is the first IGBC Platinum Pre-certified project in Tamil Nadu and is being developed over a total area of 600 acres. The project has completed its phase of over 300 acres. The multi-sector industrial cluster will feature large and medium MNCs that operate in multiple domains including automotive, logistics, engineering, medical devices, aerospace and defence among other sectors.
 ORIGINS by Mahindra World City, Ahmedabad is IGBC Gold Pre-certified Industrial Cluster and is developed by Mahindra Lifespace Developers Limited in strategic partnership with International Finance Corporation (IFC), World Bank. The Industrial Cluster will be developed over an area of 340 acres. The multi-sector industrial cluster focuses on attracting large and medium global companies across engineering, automotive, renewable energy, pharma and medical devices, plastics and packaging, food processing, aerospace & defence and logistics among other sectors.

Awards and recognition 
2015

 Awarded Mint Strategy Award for construction, real estate and steel

2016

 Porter Prize For Excellence In Governance by India's National Competitiveness Forum (NCF)
 Mahindra Lifespaces was also ranked 2nd in Asia, in the ‘Diversified’/’Listed’ category of real estate companies, in the Global Real Estate Sustainability Benchmarking (GRESB) report.

2018

 Construction World Architect & Builder Awards 2018, One of India's top builders

2019

 Ranked 17th in the list of Great Places to Work in India, in the ‘Mid-sized Companies’ category by GPTW
 fDi Global Free Zones of the Year 2019 - bespoke award in deployment of technology

2020

 fDi Global Free Zones of the Year 2019 - bespoke award in Sustainability
 One of India's Top Builders at the 15th Construction World Architect & Builder Awards 2020

The Mahindra Teri Centre of Excellence 
The Mahindra Teri Centre of Excellence was developed to reduce the footprint of the real estate industry and to influence the real estate industry and its value chain to move towards innovative and sustainable development.

Sustainable Leadership Housing Coalition 
MLDL is one of the founding members of the Sustainable Housing Leadership Consortium (SHLC), a private sector-led consortium founded in 2016.

Green Army Initiative 
Mahindra Lifespace initiated its 'Green Army' initiative in 2014 which aimed to increase awareness of sustainable living habits among children. The program identifies children as primary change agents of the future and educates them on sustainable living habits and choices.

Mahindra World City Jaipur 
MWC Jaipur is a joint venture between Mahindra Lifespace Developers Ltd (MLDL) and Rajasthan State Industrial Development and Investment Corporation (RIICO). In 2015, MWCJ became the first project in Asia to receive Stage 2 Climate Positive Development certification from the C40 Cities Climate Leadership Group (C40).

References

External links

Real estate companies based in Mumbai
Indian companies established in 1994
1994 establishments in Maharashtra
Real estate companies established in 1994
Companies listed on the National Stock Exchange of India
Companies listed on the Bombay Stock Exchange